He Who Shall Not Bleed is the third album by the Swedish melodic death metal band Dimension Zero.

The sampling at the beginning of the title song is a line by James Gregory from the film Beneath the Planet of the Apes.

"A Paler Shade of White" could be a reference to "A Whiter Shade of Pale".

Track listing 
 "He Who Shall Not Bleed" – 2:25
 "Unto Others" – 2:32
 "A Paler Shade of White (A Darker Side of Black)" – 2:33
 "Hell Is Within" – 3:02
 "Red Dead Heat" – 1:57
 "I Can Hear the Dark" – 3:11
 "Going Deep" – 2:33
 "Is" – 3:12
 "Deny" – 3:30
 "The Was" – 3:10
 "Way to Shine" – 4:05
 "Stayin' Alive" (Bee Gees cover) (Bonus Track) – 2:01
 "Rövarvisan" (Bonus Track) – 1:30. (Originally a children's song written by Thorbjørn Egner from the book People and Robbers of Cardemon Town.)

Musicians
Jocke "Grave" Göthberg – vocals
Jesper Strömblad – guitar, bass guitar
Daniel Antonsson – guitar
Hans Nilsson – drums
Recorded and mixed by Arnold Lindberg
Produced by Arnold Lindberg / Dimension Zero

References

2007 albums
Dimension Zero (Swedish band) albums